Saint-Just is a commune in the Cher department in the Centre-Val de Loire region of France.

Geography

Population

Sights
 The church of St. Just, dating from the twelfth century.
 The chateau de Boisvert, built in the seventeenth century.
 The fourteenth-century castle of Chambon.
 The remains of a Roman aqueduct.

See also
Communes of the Cher department

References

Communes of Cher (department)